Shaun Magennis (born 2 December 1989) is an English former professional rugby league footballer who played in the 2010s for St. Helens as a  or . Magennis signed for St Helens from local amateur club Blackbrook Royals.

Background
Shaun Magennis was born in St Helens, Merseyside, England.

Playing career
In 2012, Magennis was forced to retire due to injuries. He made 33 appearances for the club, scoring four tries.

References

External links
Saints Heritage Society profile

1989 births
Living people
English rugby league players
Rugby league players from St Helens, Merseyside
Rugby league second-rows
St Helens R.F.C. players